Libotrechus nishikawai is a species of beetle in the family Carabidae, the only species in the genus Libotrechus.

References

Trechinae